Hot R&B/Hip-Hop Songs is a chart published by Billboard that ranks the top-performing songs in the United States in African-American-oriented musical genres; the chart has undergone various name changes since its launch in 1942 to reflect the evolution of such genres.  In 1981, it was published under the title Hot Soul Singles.  During that year, 17 different singles topped the chart, based on playlists submitted by radio stations and surveys of retail sales outlets.

In the issue of Billboard dated January 3, the number-one position was occupied by "Celebration" by Kool and the Gang, the single's third week in the top spot.  The song's run at number one extended to six weeks before it was displaced by "Fantastic Voyage" by Lakeside, the first chart-topper for the group.  It was the first of three consecutive debut number ones, as it was followed into the top spot by "Burn Rubber on Me (Why You Wanna Hurt Me)" by the Gap Band and "Don't Stop the Music" by Yarbrough and Peoples, each act's first single to reach the peak position.  A number of other artists reached number one for the first time later in the year.  In May, Ray Parker Jr. & Raydio topped the chart for the first time with "A Woman Needs Love (Just Like You Do)", and two months later Frankie Smith reached number one with "Double Dutch Bus", the only charting single of his career.  Smith's track was followed into the top spot by "I'm in Love", the first number one for Evelyn King, who for that single was not credited with her usual nickname of "Champagne".  In October, "Never Too Much" was the debut number one for Luther Vandross, who would go on to become one of the most successful black artists of the 1980s.  Finally, Roger, front man of the band Zapp, reached number one with his first solo chart entry, "I Heard It Through the Grapevine (Part 1)".

The year's longest-running number one was "Endless Love" by Diana Ross and Lionel Richie, which spent seven consecutive weeks in the top spot beginning in August.  It was the second of 1981's soul number ones to also top Billboards all-genres singles chart, the Hot 100, following "Celebration" earlier in the year.  Ross and Richie also had the highest total number of weeks at number during 1981, ahead of five acts who each spent five weeks in the top spot.  "Endless Love" was displaced from the top spot by "When She Was My Girl" by the Four Tops, former labelmates of Ross with the highly influential Motown label.  It was the first number one since 1966 for the Tops, whose chart placings had declined after they left Motown in the early 1970s, with only one of their singles having made the top ten in the preceding seven years.  Kool and the Gang were the only act with multiple soul number ones in 1981, spending a single week atop the chart with "Take My Heart (You Can Have It If You Want It)" in November to add to the four weeks which "Celebration" spent at number one in January.  The year's final number one was "Let's Groove" by Earth, Wind and Fire.

Chart history

References

Works cited

1981 record charts
1981
1981 in American music